Rai Bahadur Sir Upendranath Brahmachari  (19 December 1873 – 6 February 1946) was a leading Indian physician and scientist of his time. He synthesised Urea-Stibamine (carbostibamide) in 1922 and determined that it was an effective treatment for Kala-azar (Visceral leishmaniasis).

Early life
Upendranath Brahmachari was born on 19 December 1873 in Sardanga village near Purbasthali, District Burdwan of West Bengal, India. His father Nilmony Brahmachari was a physician in East Indian Railways. His mother's name was Saurabh Sundari Devi. He completed his early education from Eastern Railways Boys' High School, Jamalpur. In 1893, he passed BA degree from Hooghly Mohsin College with honours in Mathematics and Chemistry. Thereafter he went to study Medicine with Higher Chemistry. He passed his master's degree in 1894 from the Presidency College, Kolkata. In M.B. Examination of 1900 of the University of Calcutta, he stood first in Medicine and in Surgery for which he received Goodeve and Macleod awards. He obtained his MD degree in 1902, and was awarded a PhD degree in 1904, for his research paper on "Studies in Haemolysis" both from the University of Calcutta. In 1898, he married Nani Bala Devi.

Life and career 

In 1922, Brahmachari also discovered a new, deadly form of leishmaniasis. He called it dermal leishmanoid, marked by the appearance of sudden eruptions on the face of the patients without fever or other complaints. He observed it as a disease in partially cured cases of kala-azar, along with those who had no history of the disease at all. It has since been termed as post-kala-azar dermal leishmaniasis (PKDL).

Awards and honours

He was awarded the title of Rai Bahadur and awarded the Kaisar-i-Hind Gold Medal, 1st Class by the Governor General Lord Lytton (1924), In 1934, he was conferred a knighthood by the British Government (1934)

Brahmachari was a nominee for the Nobel Prize twice in 1929 and 1942 in the category of physiology and medicine. He was president of the 23rd session of the Indian Science Congress in Indore (1936). He was the President of the Indian Chemical Society, Calcutta (1936). He was honoured with the fellowships of the Royal Society of Medicine, London and the Indian National Science Academy as well as the President of the Asiatic Society of Bengal for two years (1928–29). He was also the Vice-chairman of the board of Trustees of the Indian Museum.

Important works 
 Studies in Haemolysis, Calcutta University, 1909. 
 Kala-Azar : Its treatment, Butterworth & Co. Ltd. Calcutta 1917. 
 Kala-Azar in Doctor Carl Mense’s Handbuch der Tropenkranahaiten, vol. IV, 1926. 
 Treatise on Kala-Azar, John Bale, Son’s & Danielsson Ltd., London, 1928. 
 Campaign against Kala-Azar in India, Jubilee Publication on the 80th birthday of Dr. Prof. Bernhard Nocht, Hamburg, clique aqui 1937. 
 Progress of Medical Research work in India during the last 25 years, an progress of Science in India, during the past 25 years, Indian Science Congress Association 1938. 
 Gleanings from my Researchers Vol. I, Calcutta University 1940 
 Gleanings from my Researchers Vol. II Calcutta University 1941 
 Infantile Biliary Cirrhosis in India in British Encyclopedia of Medical practice. Edited by Sir Humphrey Rolleston

Notes

References
 Biographical Memoirs of Fellows of the Indian National Science Academy Vol. 4., Indian National Science Academy, New Delhi, 1976.
 Dictionary of Medical Biography Vol. 1 A-B, Edited by W. F. Bynum and Helen Bynum, Greenwood Press, 2006

External links
Profile in Dream 2047

1873 births
1946 deaths
Presidency University, Kolkata alumni
Medical College and Hospital, Kolkata
19th-century Indian medical doctors
Knights Bachelor
Indian Knights Bachelor
Medical doctors from Kolkata
University of Calcutta alumni
Academic staff of the University of Calcutta
Bengali Hindus
People from British India
Fellows of the Indian National Science Academy
Presidents of The Asiatic Society
20th-century Indian medical doctors
Academic staff of Dhaka Medical College and Hospital
Hooghly Mohsin College alumni
Medical doctors from West Bengal
Medical doctors in British India
Scientists from British India